"La Calle" (English: The Street) is a song written, produced and performed by singer Dominican Republic Juan Luis Guerra and Colombian Juanes. The song was chosen as the fourth single from the eleventh album by Juan Luis Guerra, A Son de Guerra released for airplay on 1 September 2010.

Music video
A music video for the song was filmed in Santo Domingo, directed by Jean Gabriel Guerra. It was premiered on 2 September 2010.

Chart performance
The song debuted at number 36 on the Latin Pop Songs in the United States. On the week of 23 October 2010 the song debuted at number 41 on the Latin Songs.

Charts

References

2010 singles
Juanes songs
Juan Luis Guerra songs
Spanish-language songs
Songs written by Juanes
Songs written by Juan Luis Guerra
2010 songs
Capitol Latin singles